SPM Presents The Purity Album is a compilation album by American hip hop recording artist SPM and his labelmates from Dope House Records. It was released on August 15, 2000, and this is the first of three albums to be released with Universal Records. The album debuted at number 57 on the Billboard 200 and number 26 on the Top R&B/Hip-Hop Albums charts. It contains the Tony G-produced hit single "You Know My Name", which peaked at #99 on the Hot R&B/Hip-Hop Songs and #31 on the Hot Rap Songs charts.

Track listing

Chart history

References

External links

2000 albums
South Park Mexican albums
Albums produced by Happy Perez